Kwinana is an electoral district of the Legislative Assembly in the Australian state of Western Australia.

The district is located in the south-western suburbs of Perth.

History
Kwinana was first created for the 2008 state election. It was a new urban seat created as a result of the one vote one value reforms. For the most part it combined the southern portion of the district of Cockburn with the northern part of the district of Peel; it also took in territory previously covered by the districts of Rockingham and Serpentine-Jarrahdale.

At its creation, Kwinana was calculated to have a Labor Party majority of 69.2% to 30.8% versus the Liberal Party, making it a very safe Labor seat. However, Labor candidate Roger Cook won the seat only narrowly against independent challenger Carol Adams, prevailing 50.79% to 49.21%. Adams, the mayor of Kwinana, launched her independent candidacy after unsuccessfully contesting Labor preselection for the seat. Adams sought a rematch in 2013, but Cook won with a slightly increased majority.

However, Kwinana was a very safe Labor seat in "traditional" two-party matchups between Labor and the Liberals; Cook would have easily won it with well over 60 percent of the two-party vote in 2008 and 2013. Proving this, Cook was easily reelected in 2017 with 68 percent of the two-party vote.

Geography
Kwinana includes all the local government area of the City of Kwinana as well as a parts of the City of Rockingham and the City of Cockburn. The district takes in the suburbs of Henderson, Wattleup, Hammond Park, Aubin Grove, Banjup, Naval Base, Hope Valley, Mandogalup, Wandi, Kwinana Beach, Postans, The Spectacles, Anketell, Medina, Orelia, Calista, Kwinana Town Centre, Parmelia, Bertram, Casuarina, Leda, Wellard, Hillman, as well as parts of Cooloongup, Waikiki and Baldivis.

Members for Kwinana

Election results

References

External links
 
 

Electoral districts of Western Australia